The Curse is a British comedy crime drama series which is broadcast on Channel 4.

Cast
Allan Mustafa as Albert Fantoni
Abraham Popoola as Joe Boy
Steve Stamp as Sidney Wilson
Tom Davis as Big Mick Neville
Hugo Chegwin as Phil 'The Captain' Pocket
Emer Kenny as Natasha
Natalie Klamar as Candice
Peter Ferdinando as Crazy Clive Cornell
Michael Smiley as Ronnie Gatlin
Geoff Bell as Detective Saunders
Ambreen Razia as Detective Thread

Synopsis
Comedy crime caper set in London in the early 1980s, following a gang of hopeless small time crooks who, through their own stupidity and poor judgement, find themselves embroiled in one of the biggest gold heists in history.

Episodes

References

External links
 

2022 British television series debuts
2020s British comedy-drama television series
2020s British crime drama television series
British crime comedy television series
Channel 4 comedy dramas
Channel 4 crime television shows
English-language television shows
Television series by Banijay
Television series set in the 1980s
Television shows set in London